Peter Albert Railton (born May 23, 1950) is an American philosopher who is Gregory S. Kavka Distinguished University Professor and John Stephenson Perrin Professor of Philosophy at the University of Michigan, Ann Arbor, where he has taught since 1979.

Education and career

He earned his Ph.D. from Princeton in 1980, writing a dissertation under the supervision of David K. Lewis.

He was a visiting professor at the University of California, Berkeley and Princeton University. He was elected a Fellow of the American Academy of Arts & Sciences in 2004 and the Norwegian Academy of Science and Letters in 2016.

A public lecture he gave concerning his own struggles with depression attracted widespread notice and praise in the academic community.

Philosophical work

His dissertation concerned scientific explanation. His main research since centers on contemporary metaethics and normative ethics (especially consequentialism). He is the author of the book Facts, Norms, and Values (Cambridge University Press, 2003), a collection of his major papers in ethics, and a co-editor (with Stephen Darwall and Allan Gibbard) of Moral Discourse and Practice: Some Philosophical Approaches (Oxford University Press, 1996).

Railton has playfully described himself as a "stark, raving moral realist". However, unlike some moral realists, he thinks moral facts that make moral statements true are natural facts.

Bibliography

 1984, "Alienation, Consequentialism, and the Demands of Morality," Philosophy and Public Affairs, Vol. 13, No. 2, pp. 134–171.
 1986, "Moral Realism," The Philosophical Review, Vol. 95, No. 2, pp. 163–207.
 1991, "Moral Theory As A Moral Practice," Noûs, Vol. 25, No. 2, pp. 185–190.
 1992, "Some Questions About the Justification of Morality," Philosophical Perspectives, Vol. 6, pp. 27–53.
 1992, "Pluralism, Determinacy, and Dilemma," Ethics, Vol. 102, No. 4, pp. 720–742.
 1993, "Noncognitivism about Rationality: Benefits, Costs, and an Alternative," Philosophical Issues, Vol. 4, pp. 36–51.
 1994, "Truth, Reason, and the Regulation of Belief," Philosophical Issues, Vol. 5, pp. 71–93. 
 1996, "Moral Realism: Prospects and Problems," in Sinnott-Armstrong and Timmons (eds.), Moral Knowledge?, Oxford University Press.
 1996, Moral Discourse and Practice (co-edited with Stephen Darwall and Allan Gibbard), Oxford University Press.
 2003, Facts, Values, and Norms, Cambridge University Press.

References

Sources

 4 U-M scholars named AAAS fellows

External links
 Video interview/discussion with Railton on Bloggingheads.tv
 Peter Railton and the Moral Realism (in Italian)

1950 births
20th-century American non-fiction writers
20th-century American philosophers
20th-century essayists
21st-century American non-fiction writers
21st-century American philosophers
21st-century essayists
American ethicists
American male essayists
American male non-fiction writers
American philosophy academics
Analytic philosophers
Consequentialists
Epistemologists
Fellows of the American Academy of Arts and Sciences
Lecturers
Living people
Members of the Norwegian Academy of Science and Letters
Metaphilosophers
Metaphysicians
Moral realists
Ontologists
Philosophers of science
Philosophers of social science
Philosophy writers
University of Michigan faculty
20th-century American male writers
21st-century American male writers